Nathan Görling (1905–2002) was a Swedish composer of film scores.

Selected filmography
 Kalle's Inn (1939)
 Wanted (1939)
 Frestelse (1940)
 Hanna in Society (1940)
 Her Melody (1940)
 Lasse-Maja (1941)
 Lucky Young Lady (1941)
 How to Tame a Real Man (1941)
 Adventurer (1942)
 The Case of Ingegerd Bremssen (1942)
 Stopp! Tänk på något annat (1944)
 The Green Lift (1944)
 Skipper Jansson (1944)
 Widower Jarl (1945)
 Meeting in the Night (1946)
 Brita in the Merchant's House (1946)
 While the Door Was Locked (1946)
 One Swallow Does Not Make a Summer (1947)
 Wedding Night (1947)
 Life at Forsbyholm Manor (1948)
 Pimpernel Svensson (1950)
 Restaurant Intim (1950)

References

Bibliography 
 Qvist, Per Olov & von Bagh, Peter. Guide to the Cinema of Sweden and Finland. Greenwood Publishing Group, 2000.

External links 
 

1905 births
2002 deaths
Swedish composers
Swedish male composers
20th-century Swedish male musicians